ROKS Yeongju (PCC-779) is a  of the Republic of Korea Navy.

Development and design 

The Pohang class is a series of corvettes built by different Korean shipbuilding companies. The class consists of 24 ships and some after decommissioning were sold or given to other countries. There are five different types of designs in the class from Flight II to Flight VI.

Construction and career 
Yeongju was launched on 27 July 1988 by Hyundai Heavy Industries. The vessel was commissioned on 20 April 1990.

Two sailors belonging to the ship rescued a civilian who fell into a sinkhole on the sidewalk in Poseung-eup, Pyeongtaek-si, near the ship, while out on the evening of August 5. Safety measures contributed to preventing further accidents.

Yeongju was decommissioned on 30 December 2022.

References

Ships built by Hyundai Heavy Industries Group
Pohang-class corvettes
1988 ships
Corvettes of the Cold War